Sandhya Mazumdar, born in Calcutta, West Bengal, is a former Test and One Day International cricketer who represented India. She played six Test matches and one One Day International.

References

Living people
Bengali sportspeople
India women Test cricketers
India women One Day International cricketers
Cricketers from Kolkata
Indian women cricketers
Bengal women cricketers
East Zone women cricketers
Sportswomen from Kolkata
Year of birth missing (living people)